William Holmes is an American actor known for Daughter of the Sun God (1962), The Bushwhackers (1951), and In Old Amarillo (1951).

Career
Holmes, heir to the Fleischmann's Yeast fortune, wanted to be an actor, so his father footed the bill for him to star in the early 1950s film Daughter of the Sun God. The movie was so bad, however, that it took nearly a decade for it to be released. By that time, the actor was already out of the business.

In 1950, he acted in the musical Careless Rapture at the Dudley Hippodrome in Dudley, West Midlands, England, with Barry Sinclair, Mary Allen, Arthur Hosking, Muriel Barron, Joan Norman, and Charles Gillespie in the cast.

Louella Parsons wrote that Holmes would have the top role in the film Cocobolo, directed by Henry Herts and produced by Robert Peters.

In 1953, Hedda Hopper reported "he has a children's book to be published, and will do a TV adventure series".

Personal life 
Holmes was romantically attached to Dorothy Malone in 1953. Hedda Hopper wrote, "Bill Holmes, the yeast heir, is devoting his time to writing, acting, and Dorothy Malone. Friends expect the pair to marry in December". Holmes and Malone did not marry.

Holmes was married to Shirley Buchanan. Mike Connolly reported that Holmes would marry Nancy Valentine in 1956, following Buchanan's Reno divorce.

Filmography

References

External links

 

American male film actors
20th-century American male actors
Possibly living people
Year of birth missing
Place of birth missing